The Pelmorex Radio Network was a system of Canadian radio stations in Northern Ontario, owned and operated by Pelmorex.

History 
In 1989, Pierre Morrissette founded his own communications company, Pelmorex Media Inc., and acquired several French and English-language radio stations that were serving various small and medium-size markets in northern Ontario. Pelmorex acquired the first stations from Mid-Canada Radio in 1990.

In 1992, Pelmorex also entered into one of Canada's first local management agreements, taking over day-to-day management, but not formal ownership, of Telemedia's CHAS-FM in Sault Ste. Marie.

Pelmorex became controversial as one of the first radio broadcast groups in Canada to centralize its operations as a cost-saving measure. Almost all local programming on the stations was discontinued, with only local morning shows remaining.  This process began slowly in 1991 with a midday program after a satellite uplink was installed at the CHNO-CJMX studios in Sudbury. By 1994, most of the stations' programming was delivered by satellite from a facility in Mississauga, and the stations were reduced to storefronts with just a few staff members.

The controversy came to a head in 1995, when Environment Canada issued a severe weather warning in Sudbury during the Heat Wave of 1995 Derecho Series. The warning, issued barely ten minutes after the stations had switched to the central programming feed, was never broadcast on any of Pelmorex's three stations in the city. Pelmorex, ironically, also owned Canada's Weather Network.

Scott Jackson, a former program director with the company, has written on his website that Pelmorex often neglected necessary equipment and technology upgrades at the stations, and that the company had him simultaneously serve as program director of both the Sudbury and North Bay clusters, spending half of his working week in each city.

Pelmorex subsequently sold CKNR, CJNR and CKNS to North Channel Broadcasting in 1996. All three stations were merged by North Channel into a new FM station on 94.1 MHz in 1997, known as CKNR. 

Pelmorex also converted CHVR Pembroke, CHVR-1 Renfrew and CHVR-2 Arnprior to the FM band in 1996. All three stations were merged into a new single FM station on 96.7 MHz, known as CHVR-FM. Pelmorex converted CHUR North Bay to the FM band in 1997. 

In 1997 and 1998, staff at the stations in Sudbury were involved in a four-month strike, during which all programming on the stations aired exclusively from the Mississauga facility.

In 1998, after a change in CRTC ownership rules, Pelmorex sold CHUR, CHVR, CJMX in Sudbury and CJQM in Sault Ste. Marie to Telemedia. (Telemedia had previously been limited to one station on each of the AM and FM bands in each market; with the change, it could acquire two in one band and one in the other, so it added second FMs to its existing AM/FM combos in each city.)

Pelmorex sold the remaining stations to Haliburton Broadcasting Group in 1999. The company had received CRTC approval to convert CHNO, CHYC, CKOY, CHYK, CHOH and CKAP to the FM band as well, although the conversions were still in progress when the stations were sold to Haliburton.

Stations

References

Defunct Canadian radio networks
1990 establishments in Ontario
1999 disestablishments in Ontario
Pelmorex